Mali Vrh (formerly also Plinbreg) is a former settlement in the Municipality of Sveta Ana in northeastern Slovenia. It is now part of the village of Kremberk. The area is part of the traditional region of Styria. The municipality is now included in the Drava Statistical Region.

Geography
Mali Vrh stands along a ridge south of the village center of Kremberk, just west of Zgornja Ročica.

History
Mali Vrh was annexed by Kremberk in 1952, ending its existence as an independent settlement.

References

External links
Mali Vrh (unmarked) with Kremberk at Geopedia

Populated places in the Municipality of Sveta Ana
Former settlements in Slovenia